Harpalus cardoni is a species of ground beetle in the subfamily Harpalinae. It was described by Antoine in 1922.

References

cardoni
Beetles described in 1922